The Axel Heiberg Glacier in Antarctica is a valley glacier,  long, descending from the high elevations of the Antarctic Plateau into the Ross Ice Shelf (nearly at sea level) between the Herbert Range and Mount Don Pedro Christophersen in the Queen Maud Mountains.

This huge glacier was discovered in November 1911 by the Norwegian polar explorer Roald Amundsen, and named by him for Axel Heiberg, a Norwegian businessman and patron of science who contributed to numerous Norwegian polar expeditions. Amundsen used this glacier as his route up onto the polar plateau during his successful expedition to the South Pole.

Unlike the big “outlet” glaciers such as the Beardmore, Shackleton and Liv, the Axel Heiberg is in effect an alpine glacier, cut off from the Plateau by a dolerite rim and fed entirely from the uncharacteristically heavy snow falling within its own catchment.  It falls over 2,700 m (9,000 ft) in 32 km (20 mi), most of it over 11 km (7 mi).

See also 
 List of glaciers in the Antarctic
 Beardmore Glacier
 Glaciology

References 

Glaciers of Amundsen Coast
Queen Maud Mountains